Melur is a  village in Kallakurichi district, in the Indian state of Tamil Nadu. This village has a corporation bank, a primary health center (which covers more than 20 villages around), a cooperative bank and a primary school.
The nearest town is Kallakurichi and the nearest city is Salem.

Villages in Kallakurichi district